Jakob Sciøtt Andkjær (born 7 May 1985) is a Danish swimmer studying at the Auburn University and bronze medalist at the 2007 World Aquatics Championships on 50 m butterfly.

References

Living people
1985 births
Danish male freestyle swimmers
Auburn Tigers men's swimmers
World Aquatics Championships medalists in swimming
Olympic swimmers of Denmark
Swimmers at the 2008 Summer Olympics
European Aquatics Championships medalists in swimming
Danish male butterfly swimmers